Lucy Elizabeth Cardon Rampton (August 10, 1914 – January 23, 2004) was the First Lady of Utah between 1965 and 1977.

Early life
She was born in Washington, D.C. to Phillip Vincent Cardon and Leah Ivins. She grew up and attended school in Logan, Utah. She earned a bachelor's degree from Utah State University in Logan and her master's in anthropology at the University of Utah, which later awarded her an honorary doctorate. She was active in the university's Department of Anthropology for most of her adult life leading up to, and in part including, her years of service to Utah. She taught for two years at Westminster College in Salt Lake City.

Personal life
She married Calvin L. Rampton on March 10, 1940, establishing a partnership eventually known to most Utahns as "Lucybeth and Cal". The two had met on a blind date while living in Washington.

Death
On January 21, 2004, she suffered a heart attack at her home and was rushed to the hospital. She died two days later at St. Mark's Hospital in Millcreek, Utah, aged 89. She was interred at the Salt Lake City Cemetery.

References

1914 births
2004 deaths
American anthropologists
20th-century American educators
First Ladies and Gentlemen of Utah
Westminster College (Utah) alumni
People from Logan, Utah
Politicians from Salt Lake City
Utah State University alumni
University of Utah alumni
20th-century American politicians
20th-century American women politicians
University of Utah faculty